Re Sevenoaks Stationers (Retail) Ltd [1991] Ch 164 is a UK company law case concerning the test of being unfit to run a company under the Company Directors Disqualification Act 1986 section 6.

Facts
Mr Cruddas was a chartered accountant and director of five insolvent companies, debt amounting to £600,000. He did not keep proper accounting records, failed to ensure annual returns were filed, and that annual accounts were prepared and audited, caused more debt when he knew of severe financial difficulty, traded while insolvent, did not pay the Crown debts for PAYE, NIC and VAT. Mr Cruddas had, though, remortgaged his house to raise money to pay creditors, losing over £200K. But he only paid creditors who pressed for it.

Judgment
Dillon LJ held that he was unfit to be concerned with management under the CDDA 1986 section 6. He noted that this was the first case of disqualification up to the Court of Appeal. In deciding how much of 15 years to disqualify, only serious cases, which may include someone who was already disqualified should be for ten years and above; for six to ten years are those who do not merit the top bracket and for two to five years, not very serious cases. Here a five-year disqualification was appropriate.

See also

UK company law

Notes

References

United Kingdom company case law
Court of Appeal (England and Wales) cases
1991 in case law
1991 in British law